Hugh Robert Sutherland (February 2, 1907 – September 9, 1990) was a Canadian ice hockey player who competed in the 1932 Winter Olympics.

He was born in Winnipeg, Manitoba.

In 1932 Sutherland was a member of the Winnipeg Hockey Club which won the World Championships and Olympic gold medal for Canada. He played all six matches and scored one goal.

External links
profile

1907 births
1990 deaths
Canadian ice hockey defencemen
Ice hockey players at the 1932 Winter Olympics
Olympic gold medalists for Canada
Olympic ice hockey players of Canada
Olympic medalists in ice hockey
Ice hockey people from Winnipeg
Winnipeg Hockey Club players
Medalists at the 1932 Winter Olympics